In mathematics, a Lidstone series, named after George James Lidstone, is a kind of polynomial expansion that can express certain types of entire functions.

Then ƒ(z) can be expanded in terms of polynomials An as follows:

Here An(z) is a polynomial in z of degree n, Ck a constant, and ƒ(n)(a) the nth derivative of ƒ at a.

A function is said to be of exponential type of less than t if the function

is bounded above by t.  Thus, the constant N used in the summation above is given by

with

References
 Ralph P. Boas, Jr. and C. Creighton Buck, Polynomial Expansions of Analytic Functions, (1964) Academic Press, NY. Library of Congress Catalog 63-23263. Issued as volume 19 of Moderne Funktionentheorie ed. L.V. Ahlfors, series Ergebnisse der Mathematik und ihrer Grenzgebiete, Springer-Verlag 

Mathematical series